Harvard Media, formerly Harvard Broadcasting is a radio broadcasting and digital media company in Canada. It is owned by The Hill Companies of Regina.

Radio stations
 Calgary, Alberta - CFEX-FM
 Edmonton, Alberta - CKEA-FM, CKPW-FM
 Fort McMurray, Alberta - CFVR-FM, CHFT-FM
 Red Deer, Alberta - CKEX-FM, CKIK-FM
 Regina, Saskatchewan - CKRM, CHMX-FM, CFWF-FM
 Saskatoon, Saskatchewan - CFWD-FM
 Yorkton, Saskatchewan - CJGX, CFGW-FM

References

External links
 Harvard Media
 The Hill Companies
 History of Harvard Broadcasting Inc.  - Canadian Communications Foundation

Radio broadcasting companies of Canada
Companies based in Regina, Saskatchewan